Peptidyl-prolyl cis-trans isomerase-like 2 is an enzyme that in humans is encoded by the PPIL2 gene.

This gene is a member of the cyclophilin family of peptidylprolyl isomerases. The cyclophilins are a highly conserved ubiquitous family, members of which play an important role in protein folding, immunosuppression by cyclosporin A, and infection of HIV-1 virions. This protein interacts with the proteinase inhibitor eglin c and is localized in the nucleus. Multiple transcript variants encoding different isoforms have been found for this gene.

References

Further reading